Daxin is a town under the administration of Pingnan County, Guangxi, China. , it has 13 villages under its administration:
Daxin Village
Xinhe Village
Dayou Village
Dazhong Village
Dawang Village
Xiyi Village
Dali Village
Guandong Village
Anfu Village
Xinling Village
Daping Village
Daliu Village
Guwen Village

References 

Towns of Guangxi
Pingnan County, Guangxi